Dzierzków  is a village in the administrative district of Gmina Dobromierz, within Świdnica County, Lower Silesian Voivodeship, in south-western Poland.

Prior to 1945 it was in Germany.

Gallery

References

Villages in Świdnica County